Ashton Sixth Form College (commonly referred to as ASFC) is an 'Outstanding' sixth form college in Ashton-under-Lyne, Greater Manchester. Founded in 1928 as Ashton-under-Lyne Grammar School, the college has an acceptance rate of 28% (2021).

History

19th century 
Ashton Sixth Form College first began as a grammar school attached to a parish church in Ashton during the seventeenth century. The Ashton Grammar School that came before the Sixth Form College has its roots in the nonconformist Independent Congregational school at Albion, completed in 1862. It was the largest Sunday school in England at the time, but the school closed in 1926 and the pupils were transferred to the new council school on Mossley Road.

The campus now lies on Darnton Road along with the corporate buildings of Titus Tetlow Esq of Ashton-under-Lyne. He left a sum of money in his will to promote the education of both sexes. He also left money to the trustees in order to devote funding for prizes and for the salaries of Science and Art teachers at the Mechanics Institute. Technical Schools and Colleges then emerged from the Mechanics Institutes. Additionally, George Hegginbottom, another Albion man and mill owner, left the sum of £10,000 in his will to the corporation. The money was used to erect a "Free Library and Technical Institute" on Old Street. The Hegginbottom Technical School opened in 1892 - one of the first in the country.

20th century 
In October 1904, Ashton-under-Lyne Secondary School was formed from the School of Science in the Hegginbottom Technical School. Each year, places were awarded to 32 pupils, 16 for girls and 16 for boys. In 1928, the school obtained its own building on Darnton Road, where it acquired the name of Ashton-under-Lyne Grammar School.

21st century 
In 1980, under educational re-organisation, high schools for 11-16-year-olds were created and Ashton Grammar School became Ashton Sixth Form College.

Academic performance 
Ashton Sixth Form College is the highest Ofsted-rated institution in Tameside with an 'Outstanding' rating. In 2022, 1,356 A* and A grades were rewarded to students, and 38 courses at the college achieved 100% pass rates.

The college was ranked fourth in Greater Manchester by the Department for Education, and is the highest performing college in Tameside since its inception. It also ranks in the top 10% of colleges nationally.

Ashton Sixth Form College is increasingly oversubscribed and highly competitive, with an acceptance rate of 28% (2021)

Notable alumni
 Gerard Kearns: Actor
 Melanie Sykes: Model and Television Presenter

Ashton-under-Lyne Grammar School

 Peter Buckley: Professor of International Business at the University of Leeds
 Ronald Fraser: Actor
 John Pendry: Professor of Theoretical Solid State Physics at Imperial College London
 John Savident: Actor
 Gordon Taylor: Footballer and CEO of the Professional Footballers' Association

References

External links
 
 Former school
 EduBase

Education in Tameside
Educational institutions established in 1928
Sixth form colleges in Greater Manchester
1928 establishments in England